Gabit Makhmutuli Musirepov (Ғабит Махмұтұлы Мүсірепов; ; 22 March 1902 – 31 December 1985) was a Soviet Kazakh writer, playwright and author of libretto to Kazakh opera Kyz-Zhibek. He was awarded the People's Writer of the Kazakh Soviet Socialist Republic, served as President of the Kazakhstan Union of Writers, and was a member of the Kazakhstan Academy of Sciences.

Biography 
Gabit Musirepov was born on 22 March 1902 (9 March according to the Julian calendar) in a village located in Kostanay region, then belonging to the Russian Empire. Between 1923 and 1926, he studied at the Faculty of Workers in Orenburg, and then at the agroeconomic institute at Omsk. He started his literary career in 1925, writing his first story, To the abyss (В пучине) in 1928, about events that occurred during the Russian Civil War, 1918–1920. In 1928, he collaborated at the literary journal Jana-Adabiet (Жана-Адабиет). Among his works stand out Kyz-Zhibek (Қыз Жібек), first libretto to a Kazakh opera, with music by Yevgeny Brusilovsky, and The tragedy of the poet (Трагедия поэта), written in 1958 (first version titled Ақан сері Ақтоқты, 1942), that dealt with the tragedy of Ajani, a Kazakh singer and composer of the 19th century.

He was President to the Union of Kazakh Writers between 1956–1962 and 1964–1966, Secretary of the Union of Soviet Writers (1959) and member of the 5th Convocation of the Supreme Soviet of the Soviet Union, deputy to the Supreme Soviet of the Kazakh Soviet Socialist Republic. He died on 31 December 1985.

Legacy 
The Gabit Musirepov District in northern Kazakhstan was named in his honor, as was the Kazakh State Academic Theater for Children and Youth. The Museum Complex of S. Mukanov and G. Musrepov is in Almaty.

Works

Short stories 
 Pair of Lakes (Қос шалқар, 1929)
 Urgent (Шұғыла, 1933)
 Stubby nostril (Талпақ танау, 1933)

Novels 
 Kazakh Soldier (Қазақ солдаты, 1949)
 The Awakening of the Region (Оянған өлке, 1953)
 Ulpan (Ұлпан, 1976)

Plays 
 Kyz-Zhibek (Қыз Жібек, 1934), music by Yevgeny Brusilovsky
 Amangeldi (Амангелді, 1937)
 Kozy-Korpesh and Bayan-Sulu (Қозы Көрпеш Баян сұлу, 1939)
 Poet's tragedy (Трагедия поэта, 1958)

Bibliography 
 Тулаған-Толқында, Казгиз, Kyzylorda, 1928
 Журнал «Жаңа-Әдебиет», 1928–1931
 Красноармейский букварь, Almaty, 1929–1930
 Букварь для малограмотных, Almaty, 1930
 Шығармалар жинағы, 5 томдық, т. 1–2, Almaty, 1972–1973
 Однажды и на всю жизнь. Избраные повести и рассказы, Almaty, 1968.

References

External links 
The tale of the first woman, Novellas of Gabit Musirepov
The Fifth Kind, Novellas of Gabit Musirepov
About Gabit Musirepov (On Kazakh)

1902 births
1985 deaths
Kazakh-language writers
Soviet writers